Christopher Neil Rowlands (born 2 September 1970) is a former English cricketer. Rowlands was a right-handed batsman who bowled right-arm off break.

Rowlands made his List-A debut for Huntingdonshire in the 1999 NatWest Trophy against Bedfordshire at Wardown Park, Luton.

Rowlands next represented Huntingdonshire in List-A cricket in the 2000 NatWest Trophy against a Hampshire Cricket Board side and also played against a Yorkshire Cricket Board in the 2nd round of the same competition.  He played 3 further List-A matches for Huntingdonshire, against Oxfordshire in the 1st round of the 2001 Cheltenham & Gloucester Trophy and a further game against Surrey Cricket Board in the 2nd round of the same competition.  His final List-A match for the county came against a Gloucestershire Cricket Board side in the 1st round of the 2002 Cheltenham & Gloucester Trophy, which Huntingdonshire lost.

In his 6 List-A matches, he took 7 wickets at a bowling average of 26.28, with best figures of 2/32.

References

External links
Neil Rowlands at Cricinfo
Neil Rowlands at CricketArchive

1970 births
Sportspeople from Cambridge
English cricketers
Huntingdonshire cricketers
Living people